Mostafa Mosadegh is a Swedish-Iranian professional kickboxer.
In 2012, he won the IKF World Title in Thai Boxing Championships, held in Phuket, Thailand.

See also
List of male kickboxers

References

Living people
Iranian male kickboxers
Swedish male kickboxers
Swedish Muay Thai practitioners
Iranian Muay Thai practitioners
Swedish people of Iranian descent
Year of birth missing (living people)